The Gazette (stylized as the GazettE), formerly known as , is a Japanese visual kei rock band, formed in Kanagawa in early 2002. The band is currently signed to Sony Music Records.

Biography

2002: Conception and early work
The band began in 2002 with Ruki (vocals), Reita (bass) and Uruha (lead guitar) in Kanagawa Prefecture. After being involved with other bands in the visual kei movement, the trio decided that the Gazette would be their last band. They recruited Aoi (second guitar) and Yune (drums) from disbanded visual band Artia and formally became the Gazette in January 2002.

Originally signed to Matina, they released their first single, "Wakaremichi", and first music video on April 30, 2002. "Wakaremichi" was re-released in June. By September, they had released "Kichiku Kyoushi (32sai Dokushin) no Nousatsu Kouza" and their second PV. In October 2002, they played their first solo live show, and on Christmas 2002, the 5-song compilation Yougenkyou with the song "Okuribi" was released.

2003–2004: New drummer, Cockayne Soup and Disorder
In early 2003, Yune left the band and was replaced by Kai (from visual band Mareydi†Creia) who volunteered to be the leader of the band. Shortly after this, the Gazette signed with the PS Company label and in May, released their first EP, Cockayne Soup. They started their first tour with the band Hanamuke, during which the two bands collaborated on two songs.

A second tour followed with the band Vidoll. The bands were featured together on the November issue of Cure, a magazine focusing on visual kei bands.

In early December 2003, they played a co-headlining show with Deadman. On December 28, they performed at Fool's Mate magazine's Beauti-fool's Fest. The performance was later released on DVD.

On January 16, 2004, the band recorded a solo performance at the Shibuya-AX, released on DVD as Tokyo Saihan -Judgment Day-. On March 30, 2004, they released their fifth EP Madara, which reached No. 2 on the Oricon Indie Charts. Madara was followed on May 26 by a companion DVD that included six music videos and an in-the-studio documentary. In the same month, the Gazette was featured in Shoxx magazine's Expect Rush III, a catalogue of independent visual kei artists.

A second concert DVD, Heisei Banka, was released on August 25, 2004. In September and October, they toured with fellow PS Company bands Kra and BIS. Their first studio album, Disorder, was released on October 13, 2004, and subsequently made it to the top 5 of the indies Oricon Daily Charts.

2005–2006: Nil and Nameless Liberty Six Guns tour
In early 2005, the Gazette embarked on their Japan-wide spring tour called Standing Tour 2005 Maximum Royal Disorder. The final performance of the tour was held at Shibuya Kokaido on April 17, 2005. On March 9, the Gazette released the new single "Reila".

After the DVD release of their concert on July 6, 2005, the band released their sixth EP, Gama, and embarked on the Standing Tour 2005 (Gama) the Underground Red Cockroach. On October 20, the Gazette released their first photobook, Verwelktes Gedicht, which included an exclusive CD containing the song "Kare Uta" (枯詩; Withered Poem). On December 7, 2005, the band released their first single under a major label, "Cassis". The promotional video of "Cassis", was shot in Austria. On December 11, 2005, the Gazette performed alongside other bands signed to the PS Company label to celebrate the record label's fifth anniversary Peace and Smile Carnival 2005 Tour.

With a name change in 2006 from Japanese characters to a romanization, the Gazette released their second studio album, Nil, on February 8, 2006. Shortly after, they embarked on another Japanese tour called Standing Tour 2006 Nameless Liberty Six Guns. The final performance of the tour was held at Nippon Budokan. In May 2006, they released their first compilation album, Dainihon Itangeishateki Noumiso Gyaku Kaiten Zekkyou Ongenshuu, which included songs that had been released from 2002 through 2004. In the next month, they released their second music video compilation DVD, Film Bug I. On July 29, 2006, the Gazette performed at the Beethovenhalle in Bonn, Germany, their first show outside of Asia. The concerts were arranged in conjunction with the AnimagiC anime and manga convention.

On August 6, 2006, the Gazette held a festival called Gazerock Festival in Summer 06 (Burst into a Blaze) at Tokyo Big Sight West Hall. Later that month, the band released two new singles, "Regret" on October 25, and "Filth in the Beauty" on November 1. To promote the singles, they began another tour, Tour 2006-2007 Decomposition Beauty. In the middle of tour, they announced that the final of the tour would be held at Yokohama Arena.

2007–2009: Stacked Rubbish and Dim
In early 2007, the single "Hyena" was released. , the B-side of the "Hyena" single, was used as the ending song for the horror Korean movie, Apartment. The band's third studio album, Stacked Rubbish followed on July 4, 2007. The album reached No. 2 on the Oricon charts within a day of the release. The album was followed by a long promotional tour called Tour 2007-2008 Stacked Rubbish (Pulse Wriggling to Black) that went from July 2007 until April 2008. In the midst of the tour in October, the Gazette embarked on their first European tour, performing in England, Finland, France, and Germany. The tour finale was held in Yoyogi National Gymnasium on April 19 and April 20, 2008.

In the beginning of 2008, the Gazette collaborated with GemCerey for jewellery. They released the single,  on February 13, 2008, which reached No. 3 on the Oricon charts. The DVD for their Stacked Rubbish Grand Finale (Repeated Countless Error) at Yoyogi National Gymnasium was released on August 6, 2008. The single "Leech",released on November 12, 2008, landed a No. 2 spot on the Oricon charts. On July 14, 2008, the band performed in the event Music Japan 2008 (a TV program on NHK) with other bands such as Alice Nine, Plastic Tree, LM.C and Mucc.

On August 23, 2008, the Gazette held a festival called Gazerock Festival in Summer 08 (Burst into a Blaze) at Fuji-Q Conifer Forest. The Gazette went on a fanclub tour throughout October called Standing Live Tour 08 (From the Distorted City), referencing the song "Distorted Daytime" from their "Leech" single, which portrayed Tokyo as a "distorted city," in terms of the societal and political crises sweeping over Japan.

On November 15, 2008, the Gazette hosted their first secret show in Shinjuku Station. Around two-hundred fifty people were originally anticipated to attend, but instead over seven thousand attended, the most in the band's history at the time. Owing to the number of people on the streets, the police were forced to shut it down after two songs.

On January 3, 2009, the Gazette performed alongside fellow PS Company bands in the Peace and Smile Carnival 2009 Tour to celebrate the record label's 10th Anniversary in Nippon Budokan, where they announced they would release a new single called Distress and Coma on March 25. The release was preceded by a 7th Anniversary performance called Live 09 (7-Seven-) at Makuhari Messe.

The band released their fourth studio album, Dim on July 15, 2009, followed by another Japan-wide summer tour starting in July, for which the tour's final performance was held at Saitama Super Arena on September 5, 2009. On October 7, 2009, the single "Before I Decay" was released. After that, the Gazette performed at V Rock Festival 2009 at Makuhari Messe on October 24.

In December, the Gazette held a Christmas Eve live performance to close out the year called Live 09 (A Hymn of the Crucifixion) at Tokyo Big Sight.

2010–2011: Label change and Toxic
On March 17, 2010, the band began the Standing Live Tour 10 (The End of Stillness) at Zepp Tokyo.  After the fan club tour, the band then announced a live tour, which was called Tour 10 Nameless Liberty Six Bullets starting in July with two consecutive nights at Nippon Budokan. Among all of these events, the band has also announced that they would be transferring from King Records to Sony Music Records. "Shiver" was the first single released by the Gazette under new label Sony Music Records. The single was also selected as the opening theme song to the Sony anime series Kuroshitsuji II (Black Butler). On August 4, 2010, they released their third music video on DVD titled Film Bug II, which included ten PV's from "Regret" to "Before I Decay".

Right after the release of "Shiver", the band announced the final stop of the Tour 10 Nameless Liberty Six Bullets would be held at Tokyo Dome, and that two new singles, "Red" and "Pledge", would be released.

In March 2011, the band embarked on a fan club-only tour called Live Tour 11 (Two Concept Eight Nights -Abyss/Lucy-) and 9th Birth (Day 9 -Nine-) at Zepp Tokyo on March 10, 2011. On March 23, 2011, the Gazette released a compilation album titled Traces Best of 2005-2009 and a live concert DVD called The Nameless Liberty at 10.12.26 Tokyo Dome.

The Gazette postponed the releases of their best-of album Traces Best of 2005-2009 and live DVD The Nameless Liberty at 10.12.26 Tokyo Dome which contains footage of their final concert at Tokyo Dome due to the catastrophic earthquake that occurred in Japan in March 2011. Both were later released on April 6, 2011.

The single "Vortex" was released on May 25, 2011. In July 2011, Ruki and Aoi joined in on PS Carnival Tour 2011 Summer 7 Days at Shibuya. Ruki was in a session band named "Lu/V" and Aoi was in a session band named "Aoi with Bon:cra-z". The Gazette also performed at the 2011 Summer Sonic festival that was held on August 13–14, 2011 in Tokyo and Osaka. On September 18, 2011, the Gazette performed at the Inazuma Rock Festival 2011 with TM Revolution.

The Gazette announced the release of their single "Remember the Urge" on August 31, as well as the release of the album Toxic on October 5 and the Live Tour11 Venomous Cell. The tour started on October 10, 2011, in Tokyo at the International Forum Hall A and led the band through 27 cities with a total of 28 performances held through the end of 2011. The tour finale was held in Yokohama Arena with the title named Tour11-12 Venomous Cell -the Finale- Omega on January 14, 2012. On October 3, the Gazette was rewarded "The Most Requested Artist 2010" from J-Melo Awards 2011.

2012: Division and Groan of Diplosomia tour
In the final concert of the Venomous Cell tour, the Gazette announced that they would hold a 10th anniversary concert called Standing Live 2012 10th Anniversary -The Decade- at Makuhari Messe on March 10, 2012. They also announced the release of a new album called Division.<ref name=iTunes>{{cite web|url=https://itunes.apple.com/gb/album/division/id551998454/|title= Division (the GazettE sixth album) |website=Itunes.apple.com}}</ref> The album was released on August 29, 2012, in Japan and on October 1, 2012, in the UK and Europe, via JPU Records. Division was promoted during the nationwide tour Live Tour12 -Division- Groan of Diplosomia 01, which began on October 8, 2012, and came to a close on November 29, 2012.

Before the tour, the band also embarked on a fan club-only tour, titled Standing Live Tour12 -Heresy Presents- Heterodoxy. The tour started on July 4, 2012, and ended on August 29, 2012.

The Gazette performed at A-Nation Musicweek 2012 at Yoyogi National Stadium on August 4, 2012. The Gazette also played at the Kishidan Banpaku 2012, on September 16 and 17 in Chiba. On October 11, 2012, the Gazette joined in on a music festival event called Rising Sun Rock Festival 2012 in Ezo.

The Gazette released a new live DVD,10th Anniversary: The Decade on January 9, 2013. The DVD contains the full footage from the band's 10th anniversary live show, the Decade, which took place on March 10, 2012, at Makuhari Messe. The band also announced their first tour for 2013, Live Tour13 Division Groan of Diplosomia 02, which started on February 2, 2013, at Sapporo Shimin Hall and ended March 10, 2013, with their anniversary concert the Gazette Live Tour12-13 Division Groan of Diplosomia Melt, which was held at Saitama Super Arena.

The Gazette performed at the Russian rock festival Kubana, which was held for the fifth time in Anapa at the Black Sea. The event was held from August 1–7, 2013 and featured international stars like Die Ärzte, Scooter, the Guano Apes, Bullet For My Valentine, System of a Down and many more. For the Gazette, it will be their first time to ever perform in Russia and the first time they have gone overseas since their European Tour in 2007. On February 24, 2013, the Gazette was rewarded as "The Most Requested Artist 2012" from J-Melo Awards 2012 for the second time.

2013–2014: Beautiful Deformity and Magnificent Malformed Box tour
After the final concert of their 11th anniversary celebrations, the Gazette announced their plans for 2013. Firstly, they released a DVD featuring footage from the aforementioned performance. Titled Live Tour12-13 Division Final Melt, the DVD came out on June 26, 2013. The band also released new single, titled "Fadeless", in August and new album, titled Beautiful Deformity, in October 23. The Gazette also announced a tour to promote these new releases. Titled The Gazette Live Tour13 Beautiful Deformity Magnificent Malformed Box, it started on November 2 and finished on December 28.

As part of their world tour September 2013, the Gazette returned to Europe for concerts. In September, the band went to four Latin American countries: Mexico, Chile, Argentina and Brazil. They did two shows in France, two in Germany and one in Finland.

During 2014, the Gazette held a trilogy of tours entitled "Redefinition" dedicated to their past albums and limited to Heresy members only. In March 2014, they held concerts showcasing Disorder and NIL ("Nameless Liberty Disorder Heaven"), July saw a second tour for Stacked Rubbish and DIM ("Pulse Wriggling to Dim Scene"), and a final tour in November entitled "Groan of Venomous Cell" hosting songs from Toxic and Division. This tour began on the day of the band's 12th anniversary, and was dedicated to the work they have achieved together over the last decade.
During the first show of "Groan of Venomous Cell", Ruki announced that all three Redefinition tours are to be published in a DVD box entitled "STANDING LIVE TOUR14 HERESY LIMITED — 再 定 義 — COMPLETE BOX", which will be released on 2015.03.11.

On December 24, 2014, Sony released Film Bug lll, featuring the Gazette's music video, "To Dazzling Darkness."

2015–2016: 13th Anniversary and Project: Dark Age
On March 10, 2015, the Gazette held their 13th anniversary at Nippon Budokan. They also opened a special exhibition divided on panels in which they displayed members' instrument models, showed the band's history and placed a message board where fans could write a message to the band. The exhibition was open for everyone even for fans who didn't attend the concert.

After their 13th anniversary, the Gazette announced a musical cycle called "Project: Dark Age" consisting of a 13 movements including the overture and a grand finale.
The 1st movement is their latest album Dogma.
The 2nd movement is a tour promoting their latest album. The tour is titled "Dogmatic -Un-".
The 3rd movement is a single called Ugly. The release date was November 18, 2015.
The 4th movement is another tour called "Dogmatic -Due-". It started on December 1, 2015, and ended on January 24, 2016.
The 5th movement was revealed on last year's December to be the DOGMATIC tour final, which was held at Yoyogi National Gymnasium on February 28, 2016.
The 6th movement was revealed on the same day to be another single release entitled Undying. It was released on April 27, 2016. Following this in the "Dogmatic" tour the Gazette went to the U.S. and Canada for the first time in their careers for live performances as the 7th movement. After the U.S. and Canada, the band is touring in Taiwan and China (as the 8th Movement) and in France, Germany, Finland and Russia (as the 9th Movement).
The 10th movement is announced to be the release of the DVD containing the "Dogmatic -Final-" live following the announcement of the 11th movement to be a standing live tour inside Japan. The tour is titled "Dogmatic -Another Fate-".

The Gazette performed at Knotfest Japan in November 2016.

2018–2019: Ninth, Tours and Departure from PS Company
The Gazette released their ninth studio album, Ninth, on June 13, 2018. To complement the release, a music video for the prologue track, "Falling," debuted on their official site on March 10—also marking their 16th anniversary—and then on YouTube on March 16. When the album was released as a download, Ninth topped the iTunes rock charts in Belarus, Finland, France, Hungary, Poland, Turkey and Sweden, and reached top ten in Bulgaria, Germany, Italy, Netherlands, Portugal, Russia, Slovakia and Spain.

On June 29, 2018, The Gazette announced that they have established their own independent company "HERESY Inc.", and have departed from PS COMPANY Co. Ltd.

On July 19, 2018, the first phase of their Ninth Tours started (LIVE TOUR 18-19 PHASE #01: PHENOMENON) in Hall type of venues in Japan. The phase ended on September 4, 2018.

On November 6, 2019, the second phase of the tours started (LIVE TOUR 18-19 THE NINTH PHASE #02: ENHANCEMENT) in medium-sized venues in Japan. This phase ended on December 11, 2018, with the announcement about phase #04 following.

In December 2018, The Gazette announced their WORLD TOUR 19 THE NINTH PHASE #04 -99.999- which will begin in April 2019, including performances in the US, Canada, Mexico, Argentina, Chile, Brazil, UK, France, Germany, and Russia.

On February 1, 2019, the third phase began (LIVE TOUR 18-19 THE NINTH PHASE #03: 激情は獰猛～GEKIJOU WA DOUMOU～) and took place in smaller venues that offered a more intimate feeling between the fans and the band. It finished just as it started with special live performances limited to fanclub members, on March 20, 2019.

After three years, on April 30, 2019, the first show of the World Tour was performed in Los Angeles. This world tour was held in 13 cities across 10 countries, In America, Europe and Asia. After 12 years they returned to the UK with a live performance in London where the tickets get sold-out. This time there was no show in Finland. The world tour ended on June 30, 2019, with the second show in Taipei.

On August 10, The GazettE performed in Rock In Japan Festival 2019 (Day 3) for the third continuous year (Rock In Japan 2017, Rock In Japan 2018). 

On August 15, 2019, The GazettE continued with LIVE TOUR18-19 THE NINTH PHASE #05: 混血, a live at Yokosuka Arts Theatre to prepare for the Final in September. The venue was sold-out in minutes after the absence of the band overseas, and the setlist was a mix of older songs and the new album.

With the final approaching on September 23, 2019, the GazettE changed their looks and outfits and they announced a collaboration (the GazettE × Yokohama Collaboration Project) that includes a special design day-pass for a line of the train in Yokohama, a themed restaurant in Chinatown and a Stamp Rally with rewards. The collaboration lasted from September 7 to the day of the Final, September 23.

In december 2022, former drummer Yune passed away.

Members
Current
Ruki (ルキ) – lead vocals, occasional guitar (2002–present)
Uruha (麗) – lead guitar, acoustic guitar, backing vocals (2002–present)
Aoi (葵) – rhythm guitar, acoustic guitar, backing vocals (2002–present)
Reita (れいた) – bass, backing vocals (2002–present)
Kai (戒) – drums, percussion, backing vocals, bandleader (2003–present)

Former
 Yune (由寧) – drums, percussion (2002–2003; died 2022)

Discography

Studio albums

EPs

Singles

Compilation albums

Compilations
 Yougenkyou (妖幻鏡, Moon) (December 25, 2002, Eternal)
(With the song "Okuribi" (おくり火))
 Kaleidoscope (May 1, 2003, PS Company)
(With the songs "Back Drop Junkie [Nancy]" and "Akai One Piece" (赤いワンピース))
 Hanamuke & Gazette Live (男尻ツアーファイナル) (May 6, 2003, PS Company)
(With the song "Machibouke no Kouen de" (待ちぼうけの公園))
 Japanesque Rock Collectionz (July 28, 2004)
(With the song "Okuribi" (おくり火))
 Rock Nippon Shouji Nori ko Selection (ロックNIPPON 東海林のり子セレクション) (January 24, 2007)
(With the song "Cassis")
 Fuck the Border Line (Tribute for Kuroyume) (February 16, 2011, Avex Trax)
(With the song "C.Y.Head")
 Under Cover II (Tribute to TM Revolution) (February 27, 2013)
(With the song "Shakin' Love")

Books
 "Verwelktes Gedicht" Photobook (October 20, 2005, PS Company)
(With the song "Kare Uta"(枯詩; Withered Poem))
 "Nil Band Score" Book (April 28, 2006, King Records)
 "Dainippon Itan Geisha-teki Noumiso Gyaku Kaiten Zekkyou Ongen Shuu Band Score" Book (March 13, 2007, King Records)
 "Stacked Rubbish Band Score" Book (March 1, 2008, King Records)
 "Dim Band Score" Book (September 14, 2009, King Records)
 "Traces Best of 2005-2009 Band Score" Book (October 1, 2012, King Records)
 "Toxic Band Score" Book (October 1, 2012, Sony Music Entertainment Japan)
 "Division Band Score" Book (February 3, 2013, Sony Music Entertainment Japan)
 "Beautiful Deformity Band Score" Book (December 28, 2013, Sony Music Entertainment Japan)
 "the GazettE World Tour 13 39395Mile" Photobook (March 10, 2014, PS Company)

Other releases
 "Doro Darake no Seishun." (泥だらけの青春。; Mud Covered Youth) (October 8, 2003)
 "Juuyon sai no Knife" (十四歳のナイフ; Fourteen Year-Old's Knife) (September 11, 2004, King Records)
 "Chigire" (チギレ; Torn) (August 10, 2005, King Records)

Videography

 Live DVDs 

 Music video collections 

VHS
 Sentimental Video (センチメンタルビデオ) (April 30, 2002)
 Shichoukaku Shitsu (視聴覚　質) (August 30, 2002)
 Kenka Jouto (喧嘩上等) (April 29, 2003)
 Hyakkiyagyou'' (百鬼夜行) (October 1, 2003)

References

External links

the GazettE official website
the GazettE at JPU Records (in English)
the GazettE at King Records

2002 establishments in Japan
Gr8! Records artists
Visual kei musical groups
Japanese alternative metal musical groups
Japanese hard rock musical groups
Japanese nu metal musical groups
Musical groups established in 2002
Musical groups from Kanagawa Prefecture